Werner Melzer (born 2 May 1954) is a German football coach and a former player. He spent 12 seasons in the Bundesliga with 1. FC Kaiserslautern. He holds the record for most appearances in the Bundesliga for 1. FC Kaiserslautern with 374 games played.

Honours
 DFB-Pokal finalist: 1975–76, 1980–81

References

External links
 

1954 births
Living people
German footballers
Bundesliga players
1. FC Kaiserslautern players
German football managers
Association football midfielders